Øyeren is a lake in  the Glomma River watershed, southeast of Lillestrøm. It is located within the municipalities of Enebakk, Skedsmo, Fet, and Rælingen in Akershus county and Spydeberg and Trøgstad municipalities in Østfold county.

The name
The name of the lake (Norse Øyir) is derived from øy f 'island; flat and fertile land along a waterside'.

Nordre Øyeren nature preserve
An area that includes parts of the northern ("nordre") end of the lake is an established nature preserve, listed as a Ramsar site.

References

External links
 Øyeren information center (Norwegian )
 Nordre Øyeren natur preserve (Norwegian )
 Ramsar Sites Information on Nordre Øyeren (English )

Ramsar sites in Norway
Enebakk
Lakes of Viken (county)